Hedi may refer to:

Geography
Hedi language Afro-Asiatic language of Cameroon and Nigeria
Hedi List of prisons in Shanxi province
Hedi List of township-level divisions of Zhejiang

Film
Hedi (film)

People
Hédi (name), list of people with the name

Acronyms
Healthcare Effectiveness Data and Information Set (redirect from HEDIS)

Other 
Hedi, an economic policy of ancient China.